Moses Harris (October 8, 1837 – June 27, 1927) was an officer in the United States Army who fought for the Union during the American Civil War and was awarded the Medal of Honor. 

Harris was born on October 8, 1837, in Andover, New Hampshire. He enlisted in the army in 1857, and was commissioned as a Second Lieutenant in May 1864. While a First Lieutenant in the 1st U.S. Cavalry, on August 28, 1864, at Smithfield, Virginia, Harris was faced with an attack by a superior force. After the engagement, Harris was cited as having "personal gallantry" ... "so conspicuous as to inspire the men to extraordinary efforts, resulting in complete rout of the enemy." For this action, he was awarded the Medal of Honor on November 23, 1896.

After the war, Harris became a companion of the New York Commandery of the Military Order of the Loyal Legion of the United States.

Harris served the bulk of his career in the 1st US Cavalry, until his promotion to Major of the 8th US Cavalry on July 22, 1892.   He retired from the Army on March 7, 1893.  

From 1886 to 1889, he served as the first military superintendent of Yellowstone National Park. He also married Abba Eliza Boutelle Harris (1841–1916), and had two daughters: Eleanor Sarah Harris Haverstick (1876–1949), and Margaret Boutelle Harris (1878–1970). 

Harris died on June 27, 1927, at his home in Rochester, New York, and was buried in the United States Military Academy Post Cemetery.

See also
1st U.S. Cavalry
Smithfield, Virginia
Siege of Petersburg

Notes

References

External links

1837 births
1927 deaths
People from Andover, New Hampshire
Union Army officers
United States Army Medal of Honor recipients
American Civil War recipients of the Medal of Honor
National Park Service personnel
People from Rochester, New York
Burials at West Point Cemetery